Jisan Station is a station of the Daegu Metro Line 3 in Jisan-dong, Suseong District, Daegu, South Korea.

External links
 
  Cyber station information from Daegu Metropolitan Transit Corporation

Daegu Metro stations
Suseong District
Daegu Metro Line 3
Railway stations opened in 2015